A beaver hat is a hat made from felted beaver fur. They were fashionable across much of Europe during the period 1550–1850 because the soft yet resilient material could be easily combed to make a variety of hat shapes (including the familiar top hat). Smaller hats made of beaver were sometimes called beaverkins, as in Thomas Carlyle's description of his wife as a child.

Used winter coats worn by Native Americans were a prized commodity for hat making because their wear helped prepare the skins, separating out the coarser hairs from the pelts.

To make felt, the underhairs were shaved from the beaver pelt and mixed with a vibrating hatter's bow. The matted fabric was pummeled and boiled repeatedly, resulting in a shrunken and thickened felt. Filled over a hat-form block, the felt was pressed and steamed into shape. The hat maker then brushed the outside surface to a sheen. 

Evidence of felted beaver hats in western Europe can be  found in Chaucer's Canterbury Tales, written in the late 14th  century: "A Merchant was there with a forked beard / In motley, and high on his horse he sat, / Upon his head a Flandrish [Flemish] beaver hat."  Demand for beaver fur led to the near-extinction of the Eurasian beaver and the North American beaver in succession.  It seems likely that only a sudden change in style saved the beaver.

Beaver hats were made in various styles as a matter of civil status:
the Wellington (1820–40)
the Paris beau (1815)
the D'Orsay (1820)
the Regent (1825)
the clerical (18th century).

In addition, beaver hats were made in various styles as a matter of military status:
the continental cocked hat (1776)
Navy cocked hat (19th century)
the Army shako (1837).

The popularity of the beaver hat declined in the early/mid-19th century as silk hats became more fashionable across Europe.

References

External links

16th-century fashion
17th-century fashion
18th-century fashion
19th-century fashion
Hats
Fur
Beavers
Fur trade